Christian David Perring (born 1962) is an American philosopher. He is known for his works on moral psychology.
Perring is the editor of Metapsychology Online Reviews and Vice President of the Association for the Advancement of Philosophy and Psychiatry.

Career
Perring has taught at Georgetown University, the University of Kentucky, Dowling College, and St. John's University. He is a certified APPA counselor.

Books
Diagnostic Dilemmas in Child and Adolescent Psychiatry: Philosophical Perspectives, edited by Christian Perring and Lloyd Wells, Oxford University Press, 2014,

See also
 The Guide to Getting it On
 Bill Henson
 Robert D. Hare
 Mad in America
 Poppy Shakespeare
 Misty Dawn: Portrait of a Muse
 My Depression: A Picture Book
 Layover (novel)

References

External links
Personal Website

21st-century American philosophers
Philosophers of law
Philosophy academics
Living people
1962 births
Philosophy journal editors
University of Kentucky faculty
Georgetown University faculty
Dowling College faculty
Alumni of King's College London
Princeton University alumni
Moral psychologists
Philosophical counselors
Philosophers of psychology